Punga may refer to:

Punga (mythology), the ancestor of sharks in Māori tradition
"Punga" (song), a song by Klingande
Punga, Namibia
Punga, Tanzania
Punga Mare, a hydrocarbon sea on the moon Titan
Punga, a village in Cozieni Commune, Buzău County, Romania
Punga, the silver tree fern (Alsophila dealbata)
 Gabonese National Unity Party (acronym in French: PUNGA)